Galagedara is a village in the North Western Province of Sri Lanka.

References

Populated places in North Western Province, Sri Lanka